is a Japanese manga artist specializing in lewd and pornographic manga. U-Jin has created many manga over his career and is well known for his portrayals of cute pneumatic female figures.

Works
 Angel (1988)
  (1989)
  (1989)
  (1989)
  (1991)
 Juliet (1992)
  (1992)
  (1993)
 Lyceenne (1993 Artbook)
  (1994)
  (1994 Artbook)
  (1994)
 
 
 
 
 
 
  (1995)
  (1996)
 
 Loose Socks (Artbook)
 
  (1999)
  (1999)
  (Artbook)
  (2001)
 Peach! (2001)
  (2002)
 Up-To-Date
  (2003)
 Angel: the women whom delivery host Kosuke Atami healed (2006)
 Angel season 2 (2008)
  (2009)
 Q&I (Kyūkyoku no Chef wa Oishinbo Papa and Infinity)

References

External links
U-Jin blog
 
 
 U-Jin manga at Media Arts Database 
U-Jin at PRISMS: The Ultimate Manga Guide

1959 births
Hentai creators
Japanese cartoonists
Japanese erotic artists
Living people
Manga artists from Yamaguchi Prefecture